Merritt H. Starkweather (1891–1972) was a Tucson, Arizona, architect and civic leader. A native of Oshkosh, Wisconsin, after visiting the Panama-California Exposition (1915), he moved to Tucson and began working in an elegantly simplified Spanish Colonial Revival Style architecture.  Several of his works are listed for their architecture on the National Register of Historic Places.

Life and work

Starkweather buildings reflect a sophisticated understanding of the Art Deco movement – both the Starweather Home on Adams Street and in El Encanto Estates are examples of Pueblo Deco Style. Perhaps his most significant building is the Arizona Inn: a series of lush courtyards and pink plastered buildings commissioned by Isabella Greenway.

Starkweather was a founder of the Tucson Rodeo. In 1937, he founded the Arizona chapter of the American Institute of Architects and in 1968 was named an AIA Fellow.

He founded the Tucson Blueprint Company before World War I.

Starkweather married Otilia Jettinghoff (Lily) on August 6, 1921 and died in 1972 in Tucson.

Major Tucson buildings
 Carrillo School
 D.C. Doolen Junior High School
 Drachman School
 St. John's School
 Tucson High School Stadium
 Ignacio Bonillas School
 Tucson City Shops
 Marshall Stores in University Square
 City fire stations
 Arizona Inn, NRHP-listed
 American Legion Club
 Frontier Village Buildings
 St. Mary's Addition and Sister's Home
 St. Joseph Academy
 Grandstand and bucking chutes at Tucson's Rodeo Grounds
 South Lawn Crematorium
 McClellan Stores
 Hal Burns Flower Shop
 Consumers Market on South 6th Avenue
 Myerson's Store Building on Congress and Church
 Masonic Temple Addition
 M.H. Starkweather stores, 6th and Tucson Blvd.
 Multiple residences in El Encanto Estates
 One or more works in Indian House Community Residential Historic District, roughly bounded by 5th St., E. Wash, Kane Estates, and Sahura St. Tucson, AZ, NRHP-listed

Other major projects
 Woman's Club, Safford, Arizona, NRHP-listed
 School at Pima Arizona
 Elk's Lodge, Nogales, Arizona
 Amerind Foundation, Dragoon, Arizona – home, servants' quarters, museums.
 Casa Grande Hospital, 1951

References

Sources
 Arizona Historical Society, unpublished biographical sketch.
 Nequette, Anne M. and Jeffery, R. Brooks. A Guide to Tucson Architecture. University of Arizona Press 2002.

External links
 Arizona Inn: A Historic Boutique Hotel Retreat in Tucson, AZ
 Home – Amerind Museum – Research Center, Library, Art Gallery

1891 births
1972 deaths
People from Oshkosh, Wisconsin
20th-century American architects
Artists from Tucson, Arizona
Architects from Tucson, Arizona